Ricardo Rodriguez or Rodríguez may refer to:

Sports

Baseball
Rick Rodriguez (born 1960), Major League Baseball pitcher
Rich Rodriguez (baseball) (born 1963), Major League Baseball pitcher
Ricardo Rodríguez (baseball, born 1978), Major League Baseball pitcher from the Dominican Republic
Ricardo Rodríguez (baseball, born 1992), Major League Baseball pitcher from Venezuela

Other sports
Ricardo Rodríguez (racing driver) (1942–1962), Formula One driver
Ricardo José Rodríguez (born 1952), Argentine rower
Ricardo Rodríguez (bobsleigh) (born 1967), Mexican bobsledder
Ricardo Rodríguez (football manager) (born 1974), Spanish football coach
Ricardo Rodriguez (wrestler) (born 1986), ring name for Jesus Rodriguez, professional wrestler and ring announcer
Ricardo Rodriguez (footballer) (born 1992), Swiss footballer
Ricardo Rodríguez-Pace (born 1993), Venezuelan tennis player

Others
Ricky Rodriguez (1975–2005), aka Davidito, member of Children of God
Ricardo Rodríguez Saá, Governor of San Luis Province in Argentina, 1934–1938